Turbo OutRun (ターボアウトラン) is a 1989 arcade racing game released by Sega. A follow-up to 1986's Out Run, it was released as a dedicated game, as well as an upgrade kit for the original Out Run board.

Like its predecessor, Turbo OutRun has players driving a Ferrari, this time a Ferrari F40. Players now traverse a set route across the entire continental United States from New York City to Los Angeles instead of the branching paths of the first game. In addition to a time limit, Turbo OutRun also adds a computer-controlled opponent driving a Porsche 959. The "Turbo" in the title also plays a factor as players can now press a button to receive a brief turbo boost of speed. Various power-ups which increase the vehicle's attributes can now be chosen at various stages of the game.

Ports of Turbo OutRun were released for home computers as well as Sega's own Mega Drive.

Overview
In Turbo Outrun the player controls a male driver sitting alongside his girlfriend in a Ferrari F40, racing against the clock and a computer-controlled opponent in a silver Porsche 959 in a race across the United States. The goal is to reach Los Angeles from the starting point of New York City. Unlike the original Out Run, there are no branch roads to choose from. Instead, there is only one path that can be taken to reach the goal.

A notable feature of the game is that the player can increase speed by using turbo boost by pressing a button on the side of the console-mounted shifter; the engine temperature will increase in kind on the on-screen gauge. When the gauge reaches "OVERHEAT!" turbo boost cannot be used until the temperature decreases.

Another notable difference is that police cars occasionally appear that try to stop the player. They have to either be outrun by using the turbo boost or destroyed by the player by ramming them off-road and into an object on the side of the road.

Unlike the original Out Run, Turbo Out Run offers the player a choice between automatic transmission or two-speed manual transmission.

At every sub-goal (reached after passing through about four cities), an upgrade can be chosen, the three being: Hi-Power Engine, Special Turbo, and Super Grip Tires. If the CPU opponent reaches the sub-goal before the player, at the next race, the driver's girlfriend will move to the opponent's car. He can still win the girl back if he beats the CPU opponent to the next sub-goal. If the player beats the opponent with the girl in hand, a 1,000,000 point bonus is given. Also, the girl kisses the driver in front of his CPU opponent. If the player reaches the final checkpoint, in the process, the player will pass the CPU opponent and the ending scene is played.

It was available in a stand-up cabinet, and a sit-down cabinet with decals giving it an appearance of a Ferrari F40, the car featured in the game. There were also conversion kits available to convert original Out Run machines to Turbo OutRun.

Computer ports of the game were received with varying degrees of enthusiasm. While the Commodore 64 version was widely seen as a good game, the 16-bit conversions got very negative reviews.

Stage order
The courses are raced straightforward in 4 sections consisting of 4 stages each with no fork roads:

 Stage 1: New York (start of game)
 Stage 2: Washington, D.C.
 Stage 3: Pittsburgh
 Stage 4: Indianapolis (end of section 1)
 Stage 5: Chicago (Runs along Route 66)
 Stage 6: St. Louis
 Stage 7: Memphis
 Stage 8: Atlanta (end of section 2)
 Stage 9: Miami
 Stage 10: New Orleans
 Stage 11: San Antonio
 Stage 12: Dallas (End of section 3)
 Stage 13: Oklahoma City
 Stage 14: Denver
 Stage 15: Grand Canyon (Runs along Route 66)
 Stage 16: Los Angeles (end of game)

Aside from the reduction in length (the 9000 km route would take approx 80 hours, the game can be finished in 15 minutes), some of the stages are not accurately portrayed to their real life counterparts. For example: Atlanta is nothing more than a field covered in snow (more resembling Stone Mountain Park) and Dallas looks like the Gobi Desert.

Music
Unlike the original 1986 game Out Run, the music cannot be selected. Instead, the game's background music plays in a predetermined order, depending on region:

Japan & US Layout:
 Rush a Difficulty (Stages 1–4)
 Keep Your Heart (Stages 5–8)
 Shake the Street (Stages 9–12)
 Who Are You? (Stages 13–16)

European Layout:
 Shake the Street (Stages 1–4)
 Rush a Difficulty (Stages 5–8)
 Who Are You? (Stages 9–12)
 Keep Your Heart (Stages 13–16)

In the 1993 arcade game Daytona USA, a song from Turbo Outrun can be played on the name entry screen by entering the initials TOR. The result is the opening couple of bars of "Rush A Difficulty".

Commodore 64 soundtrack 
The Commodore 64 home version soundtrack, composed and arranged by Jeroen Tel, was well received. The soundtrack won the "Best music on 8-bit computer 1989" award on European Computer Trade Show. The title track is a remix of "Magical Sound Shower" from Out Run, featuring sound samples from Jeroen Tel himself; due to sampling quality, he was actually saying "One, two, tree... hit it, Out Run" while recording, instead of "three", to avoid it sounding like "free".

Reception

In Japan, Game Machine listed Turbo Outrun on their March 15, 1989 issue as being the third most-successful upright/cockpit arcade unit of the month. In North America, by August 1989, the arcade game had reached number two on the Play Meter video game charts and number six on the RePlay upright cabinet charts.

Turbo Outrun received positive to mixed reviews, depending on the version. The arcade and Commodore 64 versions were well received. Commodore User reviewed the arcade version and scored it 8 out of 10. The C64 version was awarded 93% from C+VG and 97% in Zzap!64. The Spectrum version of the game received 70% from Your Sinclair, 78% from Sinclair User and 79% from Crash.

Mean Machines dismissed the Mega Drive version with an overall rating of 42%. The only aspect of the game to receive genuine praise was the high-scores screen design. The review pointed to "hopeless, mega-jerky 3-D graphics, juddery scrolling, dreadful tunes, naff sound effects, and badly drawn sprites", and concluded it to be a "clapped out Robin Reliant of a race game".  Mega placed the Mega Drive version at #3 in their list of the 10 Worst Mega Drive Games of All Time.

See also
Rad Mobile

References

External links
Turbo OutRun Review at Mean Machines Mag  (refers to the poorly received home port, not the arcade original)
Outrun.org
Route map
C64 Turbo Outrun intro music

1989 video games
Amiga games
Amstrad CPC games
Arcade video games
Atari ST games
Commodore 64 games
DOS games
FM Towns games
ICE Software games
OutRun
Racing video games
Sega-AM2 games
Sega arcade games
Sega Genesis games
Single-player video games
U.S. Gold games
Video games designed by Yu Suzuki
Video games developed in Japan
Video games scored by Hiroshi Kawaguchi
Video games scored by Jeroen Tel
Video games set in New York City
Video games set in Washington, D.C.
Video games set in Pennsylvania
Video games set in Indianapolis
Video games set in Chicago
Video games set in St. Louis
Video games set in Tennessee
Video games set in Georgia (U.S. state)
Video games set in Miami
Video games set in New Orleans
Video games set in Dallas
Video games set in Oklahoma
Video games set in Colorado
Video games set in Arizona
Video games set in Los Angeles
ZX Spectrum games